An interparietal bone (os interparietale or Inca bone or os inca var.) is a dermal bone situated between the parietal and supraoccipital. It is homologous to the postparietal bones of other animals.

In humans, it corresponds to the upper portion of the squama of the occipital bone that lies superior to the highest nuchal line and is completely fused to the supraoccipital.  However, in some individuals this portion remains separate from the rest of the occipital bone throughout life.  In such cases, this separate bone is particularly referred as Inca bone.  Inca bones in humans were first found in the skulls of contemporary indigenous peoples of the southern Andes as well as in those of mummies of the Inca civilization. Although the Inca bone was originally encountered as a variation in South American and Latin American cranial remains, the variation occurs in people from all geographic regions of the world and is by no means indicative of South/Latin American origin.

The existence of this Inca bone has helped to identify the mummified remains which spent 110 years in two German museums as belonging to a young South American woman who was probably a victim of ritual murder practiced around the 17th century.

In many other mammals, this bone is completely fused to the supraoccipital as in humans. However in some mammals (for example, rodents, rabbits, and artiodactyls), this bone remains separate from the supraoccipital bone.  Classic comparative anatomy have regarded the interparietal as being lost in various mammalian lineages since the interparietal and supraoccipital fuse with each other in the early ontogenetic period in many mammals, but recent study has shown that its presence is confirmed in all extant mammalian orders, particularly in the embryonic period (Koyabu and others, 2012).

See also
Wormian bones

References

Skeletal system